In mathematics, in particular abstract algebra and topology, a homotopy Lie algebra (or -algebra) is a generalisation of the concept of a differential graded Lie algebra. To be a little more specific, the Jacobi identity only holds up to homotopy. Therefore, a differential graded Lie algebra can be seen as a homotopy Lie algebra where the Jacobi identity holds on the nose. These homotopy algebras are useful in classifying deformation problems over characteristic 0 in deformation theory because deformation functors are classified by quasi-isomorphism classes of -algebras. This was later extended to all characteristics by Jonathan Pridham.

Homotopy Lie algebras have applications within mathematics and mathematical physics; they are linked, for instance, to the Batalin–Vilkovisky formalism much like differential graded Lie algebras are.

Definition 
There exists several different definitions of a homotopy Lie algebra, some particularly suited to certain situations more than others. The most traditional definition is via symmetric multi-linear maps, but there also exists a more succinct geometric definition using the language of formal geometry. Here the blanket assumption that the underlying field is of characteristic zero is made.

Geometric definition
A homotopy Lie algebra on a graded vector space  is a continuous derivation, of order  that squares to zero on the formal manifold . Here  is the completed symmetric algebra,  is the suspension of a graded vector space, and  denotes the linear dual.

Using this definition of a homotopy Lie algebra, one defines a morphism of homotopy Lie algebras, as a morphism  of their representing commutative differential graded algebras that commutes with the vector field, i.e., . Homotopy Lie algebras and their morphisms define a category.

Definition via multi-linear maps
The more traditional definition of a homotopy Lie algebra is through an infinite collection of symmetric multi-linear maps that is sometimes referred to as the definition via higher brackets. It should be stated that the two definitions are equivalent.

A homotopy Lie algebra on a graded vector space  is a collection of symmetric multi-linear maps  of degree , sometimes called the -ary bracket, for each . Moreover, the maps  satisfy the generalised Jacobi identity:

for each n.

Using the approach via multi-linear maps, a morphism of homotopy Lie algebras can be defined by a collection of symmetric multi-linear maps  which satisfy certain conditions.

Definition via operads
There also exists a more abstract definition of a homotopy algebra using the theory of operads: that is, a homotopy Lie algebra is an algebra over an operad in the category of chain complexes over the  operad.

(Quasi) isomorphisms and minimal models 

An important special class of homotopy Lie algebras are the so-called minimal homotopy Lie algebras, which are characterized by the vanishing of their linear component . This means that any quasi isomorphism of minimal homotopy Lie algebras must be an isomorphism. Any homotopy Lie algebra is quasi-isomorphic to a minimal one, which must be unique up to isomorphism and it is therefore called its minimal model.

Examples 
Because -algebras have such a complex structure describing even simple cases can be a non-trivial task in most cases. Fortunately, there are the simple cases coming from differential graded Lie algebras and cases coming from finite dimensional examples.

Differential graded Lie algebras 
One of the approachable classes of examples of -algebras come from the embedding of differential graded Lie algebras into the category of -algebras.

Two term L∞ algebras

In degrees 0 and 1 
One notable class of examples are -algebras which only have two nonzero underlying vector spaces . Then, cranking out the definition for -algebras this means there is a linear map
,
bilinear maps
, where ,
and a trilinear map

which satisfy a host of identities. pg 28 In particular, the map  on  implies it has a lie algebra structure up to a homotopy. This is given by the differential of  since the gives the -algebra structure implies
,
showing it is a higher Lie bracket.
,
showing that the differential of the 3-bracket gives the failure for the 2-bracket to be a Lie algebra structure. It is only a Lie algebra up to homotopy.

In degrees 0 and n 

It turns out this higher bracket is in fact a higher cocyle in Lie algebra cohomology.
 where  is an -cocycle
and the two-term -algebras with non-zero vector spaces in degrees  and .pg 42 Note this situation is highly analogous to the relation between group cohomology and the structure of n-groups with two non-trivial homotopy groups. For the case of term term -algebras in degrees  and  there is a similar relation between Lie algebra cocycles and such higher brackets. Upon first inspection, it's not an obvious results, but it becomes clear after looking at the homology complex
,
so the differential becomes trivial. This gives an equivalent -algebra which can then be analyzed as before.

Example in degrees 0 and 1 
Then, there is a higher bracket  given by the dot product of vectors

It can be checked the differential of this -algebra is always zero using basic linear algebrapg 45.

Finite dimensional example 
Coming up with simple examples for the sake of studying the nature of -algebras is a complex problem. For example, given a graded vector space  where  has basis given by the vector  and  has the basis given by the vectors , there is an -algebra structure given by the following rules

where . Note that the first few constants are

Since  should be of degree , the axioms imply that . There are other similar examples for super Lie algebras. Furthermore,  structures on graded vector spaces whose underlying vector space is two dimensional have been completely classified.

See also 
Homotopy associative algebra
Differential graded algebra
BV formalism
Simplicial Lie algebra
Hochschild homology
Deformation quantization

References

Introduction 
Deformation Theory (lecture notes) - gives an excellent overview of homotopy Lie algebras and their relation to deformation theory and deformation quantization

In physics 
 
 — Towards classification of perturbative gauge invariant classical fields.

In deformation and string theory

Related ideas 
 (Lie algebras in the derived category of coherent sheaves.)

External links 
 Discusses deformation theory in the context of -algebras.

Homotopical algebra
Differential algebra
Lie algebras